The 2018 Los Angeles Angels season was the 58th season of the Angels franchise and the 53rd in Anaheim (all of them at Angel Stadium). The Angels began the season on March 29 against the Oakland Athletics and ended the season on September 30 also against the A's. Manager Mike Scioscia retired at the end of the season.

Offseason
On December 9, 2017, the Angels signed RHP/OF Shohei Ohtani from Japan to a minor league contract with a $2.315 million signing bonus. He made the major league roster. 

On December 13, 2017, the Angels traded minor leaguers Troy Montgomery and Wilkel Hernandez to the Detroit Tigers for 2B Ian Kinsler. Two days later, the Angels signed Zack Cozart to a three-year, $38 million contract. Cozart is expected to play third base.

On February 21, 2018, the Angels acquired Jabari Blash from the New York Yankees in exchange for a player to be named later or cash considerations.

Regular season

Season standings

American League West

American League Leaders

Game log

|-style=background:#fcc
| 1 || March 29 || @ Athletics || 5–6 (11) || Hatcher (1–0) || Ramirez (0–1) ||—|| 27,764 || 0–1 || L1
|-style=background:#cfc
| 2 || March 30 || @ Athletics || 2–1 || Skaggs (1–0) || Manaea (0–1) || Parker (1) || 27,665 || 1–1 || W1
|-style=background:#cfc
| 3 || March 31 || @ Athletics || 8–3 ||  Shoemaker (1–0) || Mengden (0–1)||—|| 17,012 || 2–1 || W2
|-

|-style=background:#cfc
| 4 || April 1 || @ Athletics || 7–4 || Ohtani (1–0) || Gossett (0–1) || Middleton (1) || 14,644 || 3–1 ||W3
|-style=background:#fbb
| 5 || April 2 || Indians || 0–6 || Clevinger (1–0) || Ramírez (0–1) || — || 43,904 || 3–2 || L1
|-style=background:#cfc
| 6 || April 3 || Indians || 13–2 || Richards (1–0) || Tomlin (0–1) || — || 35,007 || 4–2 || W1
|-style="background:#cfc
| 7 || April 4 || Indians || 3–2  || Ramirez (1–1) || McAllister (0–1) || — || 32,412 || 5–2 || W2
|-style=background:#cfc
| 8 || April 6 || Athletics || 13–9 || Johnson (1–0) || Treinen (0–1) || — || 36,023 || 6–2 || W3
|-style=background:#fbb
| 9 || April 7 || Athletics || 3–7 || Triggs (1–0) || Ramírez (1–2) || Treinen (2) || 40,129 || 6–3 || L1
|-style=background:#cfc
| 10 || April 8 || Athletics || 6–1 || Ohtani (2–0) || Graveman (0–2) || — || 44,742 || 7–3 || W1
|-style=background:#cfc
| 11 || April 9 || @ Rangers || 8–3 || Álvarez (1–0) || Fister (1–2) || — || 16,718 || 8–3 || W2
|-style=background:#cfc
| 12 || April 10 || @ Rangers || 11–1 || Skaggs (2–0) || Perez (1–1) || — || 18,697 || 9–3 || W3
|-style=background:#cfc
| 13 || April 11 || @ Rangers || 7–2 || Barría (1–0) || Moore (0–3) || Middleton (2) || 20,363 || 10–3 || W4
|-style=background:#cfc
| 14 || April 12 || @ Royals || 7–1 || Tropeano (1–0) || Kennedy (1–1) || — || 14,714 || 11–3 || W5
|-style=background:#cfc
| 15 || April 13 || @ Royals || 5–4 || Wood (1–0) || Grimm (0–2) || Middleton (3) || 15,011 || 12–3 || W6
|-style=background:#cfc
| 16 || April 14 || @ Royals || 5–3 || Richards (2–0) || Junis (2–1) || Middleton (4) || 15,876 || 13–3 || W7
|-style=background:#bbb
| — || April 15 || @ Royals ||colspan="8"|Postponed (inclement weather) (Makeup date: June 25)
|-style=background:#fbb
| 17 || April 17 || Red Sox || 1–10 || Price (2–1) || Ohtani (2–1) || — || 44,822 || 13–4 || L1
|-style=background:#fbb
| 18 || April 18 || Red Sox || 0–9 || Porcello (4–0) || Skaggs (2–1) || — || 34,508 || 13–5 || L2
|-style=background:#fbb
| 19 || April 19 || Red Sox || 2–8 || Rodríguez (2–0) || Tropeano (1–1) || — || 36,253 || 13–6 || L3
|-style=background:#fbb
| 20 || April 20 || Giants || 1–8 || Samardzija (1–0) || Heaney (0–1) || — || 37,494 || 13–7 || L4
|-style=background:#cfc
| 21 || April 21 || Giants || 4–3 || Richards (3–0) || Holland (0–3) || Middleton (5) || 42,666 || 14–7 || W1
|-style=background:#fbb
| 22 || April 22 || Giants || 2–4 || Cueto (2–0) || Barría (1–1) || Strickland (3) || 44,544 || 14–8  || L1
|-style=background:#cfc
| 23 || April 23 || @ Astros || 2–0 || Skaggs (3–1) || Cole (2–1) || Middleton (6) || 29,606 || 15–8 || W1
|-style=background:#cfc
| 24 || April 24 || @ Astros || 8–7 || Johnson (2–0) || Smith (1–1) || Bedrosian (1) || 36,457 || 16–8 || W2
|-style=background:#fbb
| 25 || April 25 || @ Astros || 2–5 || Verlander (4–0) ||  Tropeano (1–2) || Giles (2) || 29,777 || 16–9 || L1
|-style=background:#fbb
| 26 || April 27 || Yankees || 3–4 || Robertson (1–1) || Parker (0–1) || Chapman (5) || 40,416 || 16–10 || L2
|-style=background:#fbb
| 27 || April 28 || Yankees || 1–11 || Tanaka (4–2) || Richards (3–1) || — || 44,649 || 16–11 || L3
|-style=background:#fbb
| 28 || April 29 || Yankees || 1–2 || Sabathia (2–0) || Skaggs (3–2) || Chapman (6) || 44,593 || 16–12 || L4
|-

|-style=background:#cfc
| 29 || May 1 || Orioles || 3–2 || Bedrosian (1–0) || Brach (0–1) || — || 32,345 || 17–12 || W1
|-style=background:#cfc
| 30 || May 2 || Orioles || 10–7 || Heaney (1–1) || Bundy (1–4) || — || 32,156 || 18–12 || W2
|-style=background:#cfc
| 31 || May 3 || Orioles || 12–3 || Barría (2–1) || Tillman (1–5) || — || 35,879 || 19–12 || W3
|-style=background:#cfc
| 32 || May 4 || @ Mariners || 5–0 || Richards (4–1) || Leake (3–3) || — || 41,705 || 20–12 || W4
|-style=background:#fbb
| 33 || May 5 || @ Mariners || 8–9  || Goeddel (1–0) || Johnson (2–1) || — || 36,977 || 20–13 || L1
|-style=background:#cfc
| 34 || May 6 || @ Mariners || 8–2 || Ohtani (3–1) || Hernández (4–3) || — || 40,142 || 21–13 || W1
|-style=background:#fbb
| 35 || May 8 || @ Rockies || 2–4 || Gray (4–4)|| Heaney (1–2) || Davis (14) || 33,144 || 21–14 || L1
|-style=background:#cfc
| 36 || May 9 || @ Rockies || 8–0 || Barría (3–1) || Anderson (2–1) || — || 33,689 || 22–14 || W1
|-style=background:#cfc
| 37 || May 10 || Twins || 7–4 || Álvarez (2–0) || Berríos (3–4) || Johnson (1) || 30,127 || 23–14 || W2
|-style=background:#fbb
| 38 || May 11 || Twins || 4–5 || Magill (1–0) || Anderson (0–1) || Rodney (6) || 43,521 || 23–15 || L1
|-style=background:#fbb
| 39 || May 12 || Twins || 3–5  || Hildenberger (1–0) || Ramirez (1–2) || Rodney (7) || 40,117 || 23–16 || L2
|-style=background:#cfc
| 40 || May 13 || Twins || 2–1 || Parker (1–1) || Duke (2–2) || — || 38,029 || 24–16 || W1
|-style=background:#cfc
| 41 || May 14 || Astros || 2–1 || Heaney (2–2) || McCullers (5–2) || Anderson (1) || 28,229 || 25–16 || W2
|-style=background:#fbb
| 42 || May 15 || Astros || 3–5 || McHugh (1-0) || Álvarez (2–1) || Giles (6) || 28,358 || 25–17 || L1
|-style=background:#fbb
| 43 || May 16|| Astros || 0–2 || Verlander (5–2) || Richards (4–2) || — || 28,078 || 25–18 || L2
|-style=background:#fbb
| 44 || May 17 || Rays || 1–7 || Archer (3–3) || Skaggs (3–3) || — || 30,487 || 25–19 || L3
|-style=background:#fbb
| 45 || May 18|| Rays || 3–8 || Snell (5–3) || Tropeano (1–3) || — || 40,067 || 25–20 || L4
|-style=background:#fbb
| 46|| May 19 || Rays || 3–5 || Yarbrough (4–2) || Heaney (2–3) || Colomé (10) || 37,232 || 25–21 || L5
|-style=background:#cfc
| 47 ||May 20  || Rays || 5–2 || Ohtani (4–1) || Andriese (1–2) || Parker (2) || 38,560 || 26–21 || W1
|-style=background:#fbb
| 48 || May 22 || @ Jays || 3–5 || Happ (6–3) || Richards (4–3) || Clippard (2) || 21,480 || 26–22 || L1
|-style=background:#cfc
| 49 || May 23 || @ Jays || 5–4 || Anderson (1–1) || Clippard (4–2) || Parker (3) || 25,504 || 27–22 || W1
|-style=background:#cfc
| 50 || May 24 || @ Jays || 8–1 || Tropeano (2–3) || Estrada (2–5) || — || 43,344 || 28–22 || W2
|-style=background:#fbb
| 51 || May 25 || @ Yankees || 1–2 || Green (3–0) || Johnson (2–2) || Chapman (10) || 46,056 || 28–23 || L1
|-style=background:#cfc
| 52 || May 26 || @ Yankees || 11–4 || Barría (4–1) || Gray (3–4) || — || 44,565 || 29–23 || W1
|-style=background:#fbb
| 53 || May 27 || @ Yankees || 1–3 || Tanaka (6–2) || Richards (4–4) || Chapman (11) || 46,109 || 29–24 || L1
|-style=background:#fbb
| 54 || May 28 || @ Tigers || 3–9 || Boyd (3–4) || Skaggs (3–4) || — || 20,857  || 29–25 || L2
|-style=background:#cfc
| 55 || May 29 || @ Tigers || 9–2 || Tropeano (3–3) || Fulmer (2–4) || — || 17,397 || 30–25 || W1
|-style=background:#fbb
| 56 || May  30|| @ Tigers || 1–6 || Coleman (2–0) || Bedrosian (1–1) || — || 19,494 || 30–26 || L1
|-style=background:#fbb
| 57 || May 31 || @ Tigers || 2–6 || Saupold (3–1) || Heaney (2–4) || — || 24,696 || 30–27 || L2
|-

|-style=background:#cfc
| 58 || June 1 || Rangers || 6–0 || Barría (5–1) || Colón (2–3) || — || 33,511 || 31–27 || W1
|-style=background:#fbb
| 59 || June 2 || Rangers || 2–3  || Diekman (1–0) || Álvarez (2–2) || Kela (13) || 44,603 || 31–28 || L1
|-style=background:#cfc
| 60 || June 3 || Rangers || 3–1 || Skaggs (4–4) || Fister (1–6) || Anderson (2) || 33,541 || 32–28 || W1
|-style=background:#cfc
| 61 || June 4 || Royals || 9–6 || Bedrosian (2–1) || Hill (1–2) || Parker (4) || 32,553 || 33–28 || W2
|-style=background:#cfc
| 62 || June 5|| Royals || 1–0 || Heaney (3–4) || Keller (1–2) || — || 31,514 || 34–28 || W3
|-style=background:#cfc
| 63 || June 6 || Royals || 4–3 || Bedrosian (3–1) || Barlow (1–1) || Parker (5) || 36,512 || 35–28 || W4
|-style=background:#cfc
| 64 ||June  8 || @ Twins || 4–2 || Ramirez (2–2) || Pressly (0–1) || Parker (6) || 28,383 || 36–28 || W5
|-style=background:#cfc
| 65 || June 9 || @ Twins || 2–1 || Skaggs (5–4) || Gibson (1–4) || Parker (7) || 24,061 || 37–28 || W6
|-style=background:#fbb
| 66 || June 10 || @ Twins || 5–7 || Romero (3–2) || Tropeano (3–4) || — || 28,656 || 37–29 || L1
|-style=background:#fbb
| 67 || June 11 || @ Mariners || 3–5 || LeBlanc (2–0) || Heaney (3–5) || Díaz (24) || 20,116 || 37–30 || L2
|-style=background:#fbb
| 68 || June 12 || @ Mariners || 3–6 || Leake (7–3) || Barría (5–2) || Díaz (25) || 20,402 || 37–31 || L3
|-style=background:#fbb
| 69 || June 13|| @ Mariners ||  6–8 || Elías (2–0) || Drake (1–1) || — || 28,236 || 37–32 || L4
|-style=background:#cfc
| 70 || June 15 ||@ Athletics || 8–4 || Skaggs (6–4) || Bassitt (0–2) || — || 18,356 || 38–32 || W1
|-style=background:#fbb
| 71 || June 16 || @ Athletics || 4–6 || Manaea (6–6) || Ramirez (2–3) || Treinen (15) || 19,185 || 38–33 || L1
|-style=background:#fbb
| 72 || June 17 || @ Athletics || 5–6 || Treinen (4–1) || Jewell (0–1) || — || 21,217 || 38–34 || L2
|-style=background:#fbb
| 73 || June 18 || Diamondbacks || 4–7 || Greinke (6–5) || Barría (5–3) || Bradley (3) || 33,809 || 38–35 || L3
|-style=background:#cfc
| 74|| June 19 || Diamondbacks || 5–4 || Álvarez (3–2) || Koch (5–4) || Parker (8) || 33,088 || 39–35 || W1
|-style=background:#cfc
| 75 || June 21 || Blue Jays || 8–5 || Ramirez (3–3) || Axford (1–1) || Anderson (3) || 30,416 || 40–35 || W2
|-style=background:#cfc
| 76 || June 22 || Blue Jays || 2–1 || Heaney (4–5) || Estrada (4–7) || Parker (9) || 38,028 || 41–35 || W3
|-style=background:#fbb
| 77 || June 23 || Blue Jays || 1–4 || Oh (3–2) || Anderson (1–2) || Tepera (6) || 40,612 || 41–36 || L1
|-style=background:#fbb
| 78|| June 24 || Blue Jays || 6–7 || Tepera (5–2) || Robles (2–3) || Clippard (4) || 33,102 || 41–37 || L2
|-style=background:#fbb
| 79|| June 25 || @ Royals || 0–2 || Keller (2–2) || Skaggs (6–5) || Peralta (1) || 19,535 || 41–38 || L3
|-style=background:#fbb
| 80 || June 26 || @ Red Sox || 1–9 || Price (9–5) || Lamb (0–1) || — || 37,366 || 41–39 || L4
|-style=background:#fbb
| 81 || June 27 || @ Red Sox || 6–9 || Barnes (2–2) || Álvarez (3–3) || Kimbrel (23) || 37,521 || 41–40 || L5
|-style=background:#fbb
| 82 || June 28 || @ Red Sox || 2–4 || Velázquez (6–0) || Barría (5–4) || Kimbrel (24) || 36,992 || 41–41 || L6
|-style=background:#cfc
| 83 || June 29 || @ Orioles || 7–1 || Peña (1–0) || Hess (2-5) || — || 24,007 || 42–41 || W1
|-style=background:#cfc
| 84 || June 30 || @ Orioles || 6–2 || Anderson (2–2) || Givens (0–6) || — || 38,838 || 43–41 || W2
|-

|-style=background:#fbb
| 85 || July 1 || @ Orioles || 2–8 || Gausman (4–6) || McGuire (0–1) || — || 18,351 || 43–42 || L1
|-style=background:#fbb
| 86|| July 3 || @ Mariners || 1–4 || LeBlanc (4–0) || Heaney (4–6) || Díaz (33) || 38,624 || 43–43 || L2
|-style=background:#cfc
| 87 || July 4 || @ Mariners || 7–4 || Richards (5–4) || Leake (8–5) || Parker (10) || 39,518 || 44–43 || W1
|-style=background:#fbb
| 88 || July 5 || @ Mariners || 1–4 || Gonzales (9–5) || Barría (5–5) || Díaz (34) || 32,128 || 44–44 || L1
|-style=background:#cfc
| 89 || July 6 || Dodgers || 3–2 || Parker (2–1) || Jansen (0–2) || — || 44,323 || 45–44 || W1
|-style=background:#fbb
| 90 || July 7 || Dodgers || 1–3 || Stripling (7–2) || Cole (0–1) || Jansen (24) || 44,409 || 45–45 || L1
|-style=background:#cfc
| 91 || July 8 || Dodgers || 4–3 || Heaney (5–6) || Chargois (2–2) || Anderson (4) || 42,213 || 46–45 || W1
|-style=background:#cfc
| 92 || July 10 || Mariners || 9–3 || Ramirez (4–3) || Leake (8–6) || — || 33,092 || 47–45 || W2
|-style=background:#fbb
| 93 || July 11 || Mariners || 0–3 || Gonzales (10–5) || Barría (5–6) || Díaz (36) || 35,591 || 47–46  || L1
|-style=background:#cfc
| 94 || July 12 || Mariners || 11–2 || Skaggs (7–5) || Paxton (8–4) || — || 44,027 || 48–46 || W1
|-style=background:#fbb
| 95 || July 13 || @ Dodgers || 2–3 || Ferguson (2–1) || Bedrosian (3–2) || Alexander (1) || 53,368 || 48–47 || L1
|-style=background:#cfc
| 96 || July 14 || @ Dodgers || 5–4 || Álvarez (4–3) || Jansen (0–3) || — || 53,797 || 49–47 || W1
|-style=background:#fbb
| 97 || July 15 || @ Dodgers || 3–5 || Maeda (7–5) || Cole (0–2) || Jansen (27) || 47,871 || 49–48 || L1
|-style="background:
|- style="text-align:center; background:#bbcaff;"
| colspan="11" | 89th All-Star Game in Washington, D.C.
|-style=background:#fbb
| 98 || July 20 || Astros || 1–3 || Keuchel (8–8) || Skaggs (7–6) || Rondón (9) || 42,422 || 49–49 || L2
|-style=background:#fbb
| 99 || July 21 || Astros || 0–7 || Verlander (10–5) || Tropeano (3–5) || — || 44,264 || 49–50 || L3
|-style=background:#cfc
| 100 || July 22 || Astros || 14–5 || Heaney (6–6) || McCullers (10–5) || — || 35,298 || 50–50 || W1
|-style=background:#fbb
| 101 || July 23 || White Sox || 3–5 || Giolito (7–8) || Barría (5–7) || Soria (15) || 35,285 || 50–51 || L1
|-style=background:#fbb
| 102 || July 24 || White Sox || 2–4 || Rodon (3–3) || Peña (1–1) || Soria (16) || 33,937 || 50–52 || L2
|-style=background:#cfc
| 103 || July 25 || White Sox || 11–3 || Skaggs (8–6) || Shields (4–12) || — || 34,321 || 51–52 || W1
|-style=background:#cfc
| 104 || July 26 || White Sox || 12–8 || Tropeano (4–5) || Covey (4–6) || — || 33,826 || 52–52 || W2
|-style=background:#cfc
| 105 || July 27 || Mariners || 4–3 || Johnson (3–2) || Nicasio (1–5) || — || 42,336 || 53–52 || W3
|-style=background:#cfc
| 106 || July 28 || Mariners || 11–5 || Barría (6–7) || Hernández (8–9) || — || 43,325 || 54–52 || W4
|-style=background:#fbb
| 107 || July 29 || Mariners || 5–8 || Gonzales (12–5) || Peña (1–2) || Díaz (39) || 35,396 || 54–53 || L1
|-style=background:#fbb
| 108 || July 31 || @ Rays || 6–10 || Yarbrough (10–5) || Skaggs (8–7) || — || 15,858 || 54–54 || L2
|-

|-style=background:#fbb
| 109 || August 1 || @ Rays || 2–7 || Faria (4–3) || Tropeano (4–6) || — || 9,132 || 54–55 || L3
|-style=background:#fbb
| 110 || August 2 || @ Rays || 2–4 || Beeks (1–1) || Heaney (6–7) || Romo (13) || 10,988 || 54–56 || L4
|-style=background:#cfc
| 111 || August 3 || @ Indians || 7–4 || Anderson (3–2) || Pérez (0–1) || — || 35,242 || 55–56 || W1
|-style=background:#fbb
| 112 || August 4 || @ Indians || 0–3 || Kluber (14–6) || Peña (1–3) || — || 34,814 || 55–57 || L1
|-style=background:#fbb
| 113 || August 5 || @ Indians || 3–4 || Bieber (6–2) || McGuire (0–2) || Hand (27) || 28,993 || 55–58 || L2
|-style=background:#cfc
| 114 || August 6 || Tigers || 6–2 || Tropeano (5–6) || Boyd (6–10) || — || 34,073 || 56–58 || W1
|-style=background:#cfc
| 115 || August 7 || Tigers || 11–5 || Heaney (7–7) || Turner (0–1) || — || 35,824 || 57–58 || W2
|-style=background:#cfc
| 116 || August 8 || Tigers || 6–0 || Barría (7–7) || Hardy (4–4) || — || 38,832 || 58–58 || W3
|-style=background:#cfc
| 117 || August 10 || Athletics || 4–3 || Johnson (4–2) || Trivino (8–2) || Parker (11) || 42,722 || 59–58 || W4
|-style=background:#fbb
| 118 || August 11 || Athletics || 0–7 || Jackson (4–2) || Skaggs (8–8) || — || 39,425 || 59–59 || L1
|-style=background:#fbb
| 119 || August 12 || Athletics || 7–8 || Rodney (4–2) || Johnson (4–3) || Treinen (30) || 38,364 || 59–60 || L2
|-style=background:#cfc
| 120 || August 13 || @ Padres || 6–3 || Bedrosian (4–2) || Stammen (5–2) || — || 22,609 || 60–60 || W1
|-style=background:#cfc
| 121 || August 14 || @ Padres || 7–3 || Barría (8–7) || Kennedy (0–2) || — || 21,747 || 61–60 || W2
|-style=background:#cfc
| 122 || August 15 || @ Padres || 3–2 || Álvarez (5–3) || Yates (4–1) || Parker (12) || 22,851 || 62–60 || W3
|-style=background:#fbb
| 123 || August 16 || @ Rangers || 6–8 || Moore (2–6) || Anderson (3–3) || Leclerc (3) || 18,398 || 62–61 || L1
|-style=background:#fbb
| 124 || August 17 || @ Rangers || 4–6 || Hutchison (2–2) || Despaigne (2–1) || Leclerc (4) || 27,816 || 62–62 || L2
|-style=background:#cfc
| 125 || August 18 || @ Rangers || 11–7 || Bedrosian (5–2) || Butler (2–3) || — || 24,768 || 63–62 || W1
|-style=background:#fbb
| 126 || August 19 || @ Rangers || 2–4 || Moore (3–6) || Ramirez (4–4) || Leclerc (5) || 26,681 || 63–63 || L1
|-style=background:#fbb
| 127 || August 21 || @ Diamondbacks || 4–5 || Boxberger (2–4) || Bedrosian (5–3) || — || 30,420 || 63–64 || L2
|-style=background:#fbb
| 128 || August 22 || @ Diamondbacks || 1–5 || Buchholz (7–2) || Despaigne (2–2) || — || 23,584 || 63–65 || L3
|-style=background:#fbb
| 129 || August 24 || Astros || 3–9 || Keuchel (10–10) || Heaney (7–8) || — || 42,788 || 63–66 || L4
|-style=background:#fbb
| 130 || August 25 || Astros || 3–8 || Verlander (13–8) || Barría (8–8) || — || 41,654 || 63–67 || L5
|-style=background:#fbb
| 131 || August 26 || Astros || 1–3 || Valdez (2–0) || Peña (1–4) || Osuna (11) || 37,530 || 63–68 || L6
|-style=background:#cfc
| 132 || August 27 ||Rockies || 10–7 || Johnson (5–3) || Ottavino (6–3) || Ramirez (1) || 35,305 || 64–68 || W1
|-style=background:#fbb
| 133 || August 28 || Rockies || 2–3 || Freeland (12–7) || Ramirez (4–5) || Davis (36) || 35,207 || 64–69 || L1
|-style=background:#cfc
| 134 || August 30 || @ Astros || 5–2 || Heaney (8–8) || Verlander (13–9) || — || 30,371 || 65–69 || W1
|-style=background:#cfc
| 135 || August 31 || @ Astros || 3–0 || Barría (9–8) || Valdez (2–1) || Parker (13) || 35,675 || 66–69 || W2
|-

|-style=background:#fbb
| 136 || September 1 || @ Astros || 3–7 || Smith (5–1) || Bedrosian (5–4) || — || 41,622 || 66–70 || L1
|-style=background:#fbb
| 137 || September 2 || @ Astros || 2–4 || Cole (13–5) || Ohtani (4–2) || Osuna (12) || 41,506 || 66–71 || L2
|-style=background:#cfc
| 138 || September 3 || @ Rangers || 3–1 || Cole (1–2) || Curtis (0–1) || Parker (14) || 21,048 || 67–71 || W1
|-style=background:#fbb
| 139 || September 4 || @ Rangers || 2–4 || Minor (11–7) || Heaney (8–9) || Leclerc (9) || 17,625 || 67–72 || L1
|-style=background:#cfc
| 140 || September 5 || @ Rangers || 9–3 || Barría (10–8) || Colón (7–12) || — || 19,966 || 68–72 || W1
|-style=background:#cfc
| 141 || September 7 || @ White Sox || 5–2 || Peña (2–4) || Rodón (6–5) || Buttrey (1) || 18,236 || 69–72 || W2
|-style=background:#cfc
| 142 || September 8 || @ White Sox || 12–3 || Shoemaker (2–0) || Shields (6–16) || — || 27,146 || 70–72 || W3
|-style=background:#cfc
| 143 || September 9 || @ White Sox || 1–0 || Heaney (9–9) || Hamilton (0–1) || Álvarez (1) || 24,020 || 71–72 || W4
|-style=background:#fbb
| 144|| September 10 || Rangers || 2–5 || Minor (12–7) || Barría (10–9) || Leclerc (10) || 32,891 || 71–73 || L1
|-style=background:#cfc
| 145 || September 11 || Rangers || 1–0 || Ramirez (5–5) || Sampson (0–1) || Buttrey (2) || 33,756 || 72–73 || W1
|-style=background:#cfc
| 146 || September 12 || Rangers || 8–1 || Peña (3–4) || Gallardo (8–5) || — || 33,028 || 73–73 || W2
|-style=background:#fbb
| 147 || September 13 || Mariners || 2–8 || Leake (10–9) || Despaigne (2–3) || — || 33,328 || 73–74 || L1
|-style=background:#fbb
| 148 || September 14 || Mariners || 0–5 || Warren (3–2) || Shoemaker (2–1) || — || 39,872 || 73–75 || L2
|-style=background:#fbb
| 149 || September 15 || Mariners || 5–6 || Pazos (4–1) || Álvarez (5–4) || Díaz (55) || 42,292 || 73–76 || L3
|-style=background:#cfc
| 150 || September 16 || Mariners || 4–3 || Cole (2–2) || Vincent (3–4) || Buttrey (3) || 35,578 || 74–76 || W1
|-style=background:#cfc
| 151 || September 18 || @ Athletics || 9–7 || Ramirez (6–5) || Trivino (8–3) || Buttrey (4) || 15,031 || 75–76 || W2
|-style=background:#fbb
| 152 || September 19 || @ Athletics || 0–10 || Anderson (4–5) || Peña (3–5) || — || 16,425 || 75–77 || L1
|-style=background:#fbb
| 153 || September 20 || @ Athletics || 3–21 || Jackson (6–3) || Shoemaker (2–2) || — || 17,217 || 75–78 || L2
|-style=background:#fbb
| 154 || September 21 || @ Astros || 3–11 || Cole (15–5) || Heaney (9–10) || — || 39,977 || 75–79 || L3
|-style=background:#fbb
| 155 || September 22 || @ Astros || 5–10 || McHugh (6–2)  || Buttrey (0–1) || — || 41,822 || 75–80 || L4
|-style=background:#fbb
| 156 || September 23 || @ Astros || 2–6 || Valdez (4–1) || Skaggs (8–9) || — || 43,247 || 75–81 || L5
|-style=background:#cfc
| 157 || September 24 || Rangers || 5–4  || Cole (3–2) || Moore (3–8) || — || 29,052 || 76–81 || W1
|-style=background:#cfc
| 158 || September 25 || Rangers || 4–1 || Ramirez (7–5) || Gallardo (8–7) || Robles (1) || 36,308 || 77–81 || W2
|-style=background:#cfc
| 159 || September 26 || Rangers || 3–2 || Álvarez (6–4) || Martin (1–5) || Johnson (2) || 35,991 || 78–81 || W3
|-style=background:#cfc
| 160 || September 28 || Athletics || 8–5 || Cole (4–2) || Fiers (12–8) || Robles (2) || 35,041 || 79–81 || W4
|-style=background:#fbb
| 161 || September 29 || Athletics || 2–5 || Cahill (7–4) || Skaggs (8–10) || Treinen (38) || 43,762 || 79–82 || L1
|-style=background:#cfc
| 162 || September 30 || Athletics || 5–4 || Bridwell (1–0) || Hatcher (3–3) || — || 36,892 || 80–82 || W1
|-

|-
| Legend:       = Win       = Loss       = PostponementBold = Angels team member

Record against opponents

Roster

Farm system

All coaches and rosters can be found on each team's website.

See also
Los Angeles Angels
Angel Stadium

References

External links
Los Angeles Angels Official Site
2018 Los Angeles Angels season at Baseball Reference

Los Angeles Angels
Los Angeles Angels
Los Angeles Angels seasons